Schulmädchen (German for "schoolgirls") is a comedy series aired on RTL Television in Germany beginning in 2002. A total of fifteen episodes have been produced as of 2005. While the show's title is a clear reference to Schulmädchen-Report, a series of soft core porn movies made in Germany in the 1970s, the show itself is a parody of imported American teen dramas such as the 1988 movie Heathers and television series Beverly Hills, 90210, which have long been popular in Germany.

The show follows the adventures of a group of pushy, wealthy teenage girls at the fictitious Franz Josef Strauss-Gymnasium in Munich. (Several of Strauss' descendants have protested the use of his name on the show.)

The show stars Birthe Wolter as Laura, Laura Osswald as Cara, Simone Hanselmann as Stella and Arzu Bazman as Ramona. The show's theme song is "Hey Baby" by No Doubt.

Seasons

Season 1

Season 2

External links 
 
 Schulmädchen on RTL.de

German comedy television series
RTL (German TV channel) original programming
2002 German television series debuts
2005 German television series endings
German-language television shows